This is a list of broadcast television stations that are licensed in the U.S. state of West Virginia.

Full-power stations
VC refers to the station's PSIP virtual channel. RF refers to the station's physical RF channel.

Defunct full-power stations
Channel 35: WJPB-TV - ABC/DuMont/NBC - Fairmont (3/17/1954-2/28/1955)
Channel 49: WKNA-TV - ABC/DuMont - Charleston (9/17/1953-2/12/1955)

Low-power stations

Translators

Cable-only stations
WBWO - The CW - Wheeling

See also
 West Virginia media
 List of newspapers in West Virginia
 List of radio stations in West Virginia
 Media of cities in West Virginia: Charleston, Huntington, Wheeling

Bibliography

External links
 
 
 
 West Virginia Broadcasters Association
 

West Virginia

Television stations